The Catharijnesingel is a street and historic canal in the Dutch city of Utrecht, which was formerly home to a motorway that was demolished and converted into public green space. The street and canal run along the northern part of the Stadsbuitengracht from the Ledig Erf and Westerkade to the Smakkelaarsveld and Daalsesingel into which it merges. The canal runs under Hoog Catharijne shopping center, which contains transparent water features giving visitors to Hoog Catharijne a view of the boats sailing below. In 1973, the original canal was drained and replaced with the Catharijnebaan, which was a short sunken city highway in the city center of Utrecht that was closed to traffic in 2010 as part of an urban development project to make Utrecht safer for pedestrians. In 2020, the canal was restored and opened to the public.

Gallery

References

Canals in Utrecht (province)
Demolished highways
Streets in the Netherlands
Transport in Utrecht (city)